Richard Terry Bates (born 17 June 1972) is a former English cricketer. Bates was a right-handed batsman who bowled right-arm off break. He was born in Stamford, Lincolnshire.

Cricket career
Bates was a junior at Bourne CC and a made his debut in county cricket for Lincolnshire in the Minor Counties Championship against Bedfordshire in 1990. Bates played 2 further Championship matches for the county, against Hertfordshire in 1990 and Cumberland in 2006. He played 3 matches for the county in the MCCA Knockout Trophy: Twice against Suffolk and once against Devon. Bates made his debut in List A cricket for Lincolnshire in the 1990 NatWest Trophy against Gloucestershire.

In 1993, he made his debut in first-class cricket for Nottinghamshire against Oxford University. From 1993 to 1999, he represented the county in 33 first-class matches, the last of which came against Northamptonshire. In his 33 first-class matches, he scored 450 runs at an average of 12.50, with a high score of 34, while in the field he took 18 catches. With the ball he took 50 wickets at a bowling average of 50.40, with a single five wicket haul which gave him best figures of 5/88.

It was in List A cricket that Bates played the majority of his cricket for Nottinghamshire. From 1993 to 1999, he represented the county in 69 matches, the last of which came against Somerset. During his List A playing span with Nottinghamshire, he scored 234 runs at an average of 8.66, with a high score of 28*, while in the field he took 29 catches. With the ball he took 63 wickets at a bowling average of 34.07, with best figures of 3/21.

In 2002, he represented the Nottinghamshire Cricket Board in a single List A match against Cumberland in the 1st round of the 2003 Cheltenham & Gloucester Trophy which was played in 2002.

Coaching career
Bates was appointed the coach of the England women's cricket team in 2003. He held the position for 4 years, during which he aided them in regaining the Women's Ashes in 2005. He quit the job in April 2007 and subsequently moved with his family to Australia.

References

External links
Richard Bates at Cricinfo
Richard Bates at CricketArchive

1972 births
Living people
People from Stamford, Lincolnshire
English cricketers
Lincolnshire cricketers
Nottinghamshire cricketers
Nottinghamshire Cricket Board cricketers
English cricket coaches
English expatriate sportspeople in Australia